Takin' It 2 the Next Level is an album by the jazz group the World Saxophone Quartet released by the Canadian Justin Time label. The album features performances by Hamiet Bluiett, John Purcell, Oliver Lake and David Murray, with a rhythm section of Don Blackman, Calvin X Jones and Ronnie Burrage.

Reception

The AllMusic review by Scott Yanow awarded the album 3 stars, stating, "Mostly sticking to group originals, the expanded band explores many moods on such numbers as "Wiring," "Rio," "The Desegregation of Our Children" and "When Thee Monarchs Come to Town."

The authors of the Penguin Guide to Jazz Recordings wrote: "The results are typically spirited and entirely within the WSQ tradition," but cautioned: "it's hard to avoid the feeling that the group is not continuing out of any artistic necessity."

A Billboard reviewer commented: "For the World Saxophone Quartet... the 'next level' expands its sound beyond accompanying percussion... Yet even these... additions couldn't change the wild, reedy nature of this ground-breaking ensemble."

Track listing
 "Wiring" (Lake) - 6:28  
 "Soft Landing" (Lake) - 1:11  
 "Rio" (Lake) - 7:30  
 "The Peace Before" (Blackman) - 1:23  
 "Blues for a Warrior Spirit" (Bluiett) - 13:08  
 "The Desegregation of Our Children" (Murray) - 12:35  
 "When the Monarchs Come to Town" (Murray) - 2:51  
 "Endless Flight" (Burrage) - 7:35  
 "Ballad After Us" (Purcell) - 4:36  
 "Australopithecus" (Antonio Underwood) - 9:29

Personnel
Hamiet Bluiett — baritone saxophone, contra-alto clarinet
John Purcell — saxello, alto flute, English horn, alto and C flutes
Oliver Lake — alto saxophone, vocals
David Murray — tenor saxophone, bass clarinet
Donald Blackman — keyboards
Calvin X Jones — bass
Ronnie Burrage — drums

References 

1996 albums
World Saxophone Quartet albums